Chałupki Dębniańskie  (Khalupky Dubnians’ki) is a village in the administrative district of Gmina Leżajsk, within Leżajsk County, Subcarpathian Voivodeship, in south-eastern Poland.

References

Villages in Leżajsk County